US Post Office-Honeoye Falls is a historic post office building located at Honeoye Falls in Monroe County, New York. It was designed and built in 1940, and is one of a number of post offices in New York State designed by the Office of the Supervising Architect of the Treasury Department, Louis A. Simon.

It was listed on the National Register of Historic Places in 1989.

References

Honeoye Falls
Government buildings completed in 1940
Colonial Revival architecture in New York (state)
Buildings and structures in Monroe County, New York
National Register of Historic Places in Monroe County, New York